Uşak Airport is the main airport of the city of Uşak in the Aegean Region of Turkey.

Statistics

External links
 Official website

References

 

Airport
Airports in Turkey
Buildings and structures in Uşak Province
Transport in Uşak Province